James (also known as Jimmy or Pops) McFadden was an American tap dancer.

Career
In his lifetime, McFadden danced with some of the best big bands that ever roared through the 1920s, 1930s, and 1940s.  He and his partners performed nationwide with the likes of Count Basie, Louis Armstrong, Charlie Parker, Nat "King" Cole and a young sensation named Sammy Davis Jr.  While still in high school in 1928 with 3 fellow dancers, "Jimmy" started a vaudeville dance group titled the Four Chocolate Drops.  Before long the group was performing on the vaudeville circuit for RKO General Inc., then one of the three largest vaudeville promoters.  Eventually, the group was asked to join the popular show "Crazy Quilt," starring Fanny Brice.  Dizzy Gillespie also asked the group to join his band. McFadden performed throughout the country in the smoky nightclubs and theaters that were common on the street corners in every large city.

Sources
Information taken from the Kansas City Times - Wednesday, February 6, 1985.

Vaudeville performers
American tap dancers
Year of death missing
Year of birth missing